Thomas Walter Swan (December 20, 1877 – July 13, 1975) was a United States circuit judge of the United States Court of Appeals for the Second Circuit.

Education and career

Born in Norwich, Connecticut Swan received an Artium Baccalaureus degree from Yale University in 1900. He received a Bachelor of Laws from Harvard Law School in 1903. He was in private practice of law in Chicago, Illinois from 1903 to 1916. He was a lecturer in law at the University of Chicago from 1903 to 1904, and in 1908. He was Dean and Professor of Law at Yale Law School from 1916 to 1927.

Federal judicial service

Swan was nominated by President Calvin Coolidge on December 15, 1926, to a seat on the United States Court of Appeals for the Second Circuit vacated by Judge Henry Wade Rogers. He was confirmed by the United States Senate on December 22, 1926, and received his commission the same day. He served as Chief Judge and as a member of the Judicial Conference of the United States from 1951 to 1953. He assumed senior status on July 1, 1953. His service was terminated on July 13, 1975, due to his death.

Notable decisions as sitting judge 

 Nichols v. Universal Pictures Corp. - 1930
 United States v. One Package of Japanese Pessaries - 1936
 United States v. Peoni - 1938
 Kenan v. Commissioner - 1940
 United States v. Crimmins - 1941
 United States v. Alcoa - 1945
 Farid-Es-Sultaneh v. Commissioner - 1947
 United States v. Drescher - 1950
American Communications Ass'n v. Douds - 1950
 Wilko v. Swan - 1953
Stanton v. United States - 1959

See also
 List of United States federal judges by longevity of service

References

Sources
 
  (biography of Learned Hand, Swan's fellow judge on the Second Circuit, contains extensive discussion of Swan)
 Marcia Nelson, The Remarkable Hands: An Affectionate Portrait (Federal Bar Foundation 1983)
 Marvin Schick, Learned Hand's Court (Johns Hopkins 1970)

1877 births
1975 deaths
Judges of the United States Court of Appeals for the Second Circuit
United States court of appeals judges appointed by Calvin Coolidge
20th-century American judges
Yale University alumni
Harvard Law School alumni
Deans of Yale Law School
Yale Sterling Professors